Guido Andreozzi and Guillermo Durán were the defending champions but only Andreozzi chose to defend his title, partnering Andrés Molteni. Andreozzi successfully defended his title.

Andreozzi and Molteni won the title after defeating Hugo Dellien and Federico Zeballos 6–7(3–7), 6–2, [10–1] in the final.

Seeds

Draw

References

External links
 Main draw

Challenger de Buenos Aires - Doubles
2019 Doubles